Clutia pulchella, the lightning bush, is a southern African dioecious shrub of the family Peraceae. It occurs at middle altitudes in Namibia, Mozambique, Zimbabwe, Eswatini, Botswana, Lesotho and South Africa.

Description

The twigs are green with some wart-like growths. Leaf shape is somewhat variable, either blunt-tipped ovate or broadly lanceolate. The foliage is bluish-green but sometimes interspersed with some bright orange leaves. They are soft with venation that is transparent against light, besides the numerous glands that dot each leaf.

The axillary flowers develop into spherical, clearly three-chambered capsules. Seeds are released when the dry capsules burst open.

It is a food plant for the Heidelberg copper butterfly. It is similar to the related monoecious species C. abyssinica, which has the leaves more elongated.

Infra-specific taxa 
 Clutia pulchella var. pulchella – widespread
 Clutia pulchella var. franksiae Prain – localized in South Africa
 Clutia pulchella var. obtusata Sond. – localized in South Africa and Zimbabwe

Notes

References

External links 

Peraceae
Flora of Africa
Plants described in 1753
Taxa named by Carl Linnaeus